Social Policy & Society is a quarterly peer-reviewed academic journal in the fields of Social Policy and Sociology. It was founded in 2002 and is published by Cambridge University Press. Social Policy & Society is a journal of the UK Social Policy Association.

Abstracting and indexing
The journal is abstracted and indexed in (inter alia):

References

External links

English-language journals
Quarterly journals
Cambridge University Press academic journals
Sociology journals
Publications established in 2002